Beit Ur al-Tahta (lit. "Lower house of straw") is a Palestinian village located in the central West Bank, in the Ramallah and Al-Bireh Governorate of the State of Palestine. According to the Palestinian Central Bureau of Statistics, Beit Ur at-Tahta had a population of 4,372 inhabitants in mid-2007.

Location and geography
It is bordered by Beit Ur al Fauqa to the east, Deir Ibzi to the east and north, Saffa and Beit Sira to the west, and Kharbatha al Misbah to the south.

The old center of Beit Ur al-Tahta is located in the southern part of the village, while the northern part is marked by wide terraces and is the site of several of the village's archaeological pieces. The total area of the village is 5,653 dunams, of which 773 dunams were built-up areas.

History

Ancient and classical periods 

Beit Ur al-Tahta has been identified as the site of Lower Bethoron. The modern Arabic name preserves part of the biblical name for the village, believed to be the namesake of the Canaanite deity Horon.

Archaeological findings indicate that Lower Bethoron was established before Upper Bethoron (Beit Ur al-Foqa); potsherds found in Beit Ur al-Fauqa date from the Iron Age onward, while potsherds from the lower town date from the Late Bronze Age.

In January 2001, a burial cave was discovered on the southern outskirts of the village. The cave consisted of two chambers and an arched doorway. Artifacts inside the cave included several pottery fragments, a cooking pot, a bowl and goblet dating to the late Second Temple period (1st century BCE–1st century CE).

Byzantine period
To the west of the village is the ruins of a chapel, apparently from the Byzantine period, and ceramics from the same period have also been found.

Crusader period
During the Crusader period, the place was mentioned in the 12th century as a fief of the Holy Sepulchre.

Ottoman period
In 1596 the village appeared in Ottoman tax registers under the name of Bayt 'Ur as-Sufla and was part of the Nahiya ("Subdistrict") of Quds of the Liwa ("District") of Quds. It had a population of 20 Muslim households who paid a fixed tax rate of 25% on various agricultural products, including wheat, barley, olives, goats and/or beehives; a total of 3,700 akçe.

In 1838 it was noted as a Muslim village, located in the Beni Malik area, west of Jerusalem.

A 19th-century traveler visiting the town found the remains of ancient foundations, rock-cut cisterns and a tomb that was said to have contained treasures. Father P.M. Séjourné, revisiting the site, noticed the ruins of a large church: "The mosaic pavement of an important church located northeast of the village has disappeared, at least for the moment, under a watermelon field. The scattered spoils of the Christian building have enriched the neighbouring modern mosque and many hovels nearby. Fragments of a graceful frieze, capitals with Corinthian acanthus carved in white marble, columns and dressed stones lie unused along the roads." Another researcher, Victor Guérin, saw two columns from the church inside the local mosque. Based on these finds, it was concluded that the village was once Christian, and had a large three-nave church. Guerin added that the people of the village worship a particular woman known as "Hanieh bent-Yakoub" in a dome at the neighboring ruin of Khirbet Hallabeh.

An official Ottoman village list from about 1870 showed that Bet Ur et-Tatha had 35 houses and a population of 185, though it only counted the men.

In 1883, the PEF's Survey of Western Palestine described Beit 'Ur et Tahta  as "A village of moderate size on a low ridge with wells to the west. In the middle of the village is the sacred place of Neby 'Or, with a palm tree in the courtyard: near it is a well in the street.

British Mandate period
In the 1922 census of Palestine, conducted by the British Mandate authorities, Beit Ur al-Tahta had a population of 470, all Muslims, while at the 1931 census, Beit 'Ur al-Tahta had 117 occupied houses and a population of 611, still all Muslim.

In the 1945 statistics the population was 710, all Muslims, while the total land area was 4,619 dunams, according to an official land and population survey. Of this, 2,045 were allocated for plantations and irrigable land, 1,780 for cereals, while 41 dunams were classified as built-up (urban) areas.

Jordanian period
In the wake of the 1948 Arab–Israeli War, and after the 1949 Armistice Agreements, Beit Ur al-Tahta came under Jordanian rule. 

In 1961, the population was 1,198 persons.

Post-1967
Since the Six-Day War in 1967, Beit Ur al-Tahta has been under Israeli occupation. The population in the 1967 census conducted by the Israeli authorities was of 920, of whom 60 originated from the Israeli territory.

In the 1980s and 1990s, lands belonging to Beit Ur al-Tahta were confiscated by the Israeli government to build Highway 443 along the Pass of Bethoron. A petition challenging the move submitted to the Supreme Court of Israel in September 1983 was rejected by Justice Aharon Barak who ruled that under international law, a military government have the right to infringe private property if a number of conditions are fulfilled, stating that "The step is taken for the benefit of the local population". Highway 443 initially served as a main approach road linking the 25,000 inhabitants of six villages to each other's and to Ramallah. After the outbreak of the Second Intifada, the Israeli military prevented Palestinian use of the road and blocked some parts of it without a legal order, and the construction of the Israeli West Bank barrier closed off access to the old road, which lengthened the journey. In 2007, the Israeli High Court of Justice ordered the state of Israel to explain why the road has been blocked for seven years without a legal order and why Palestinians are prevented from using it.

After the 1995 accords, 36.7% of village land was classified as Area B land, and the remaining 63.3% as Area C. Israel has confiscated land from the village in order to construct the Israeli settlement of Beit Horon.

In October 2009, infrastructure improvements were completed in Beit Ur al-Tahta that included improved roads and street lighting. The project was funded by American Charities for Palestine, the United States Agency for International Development (USAID) and the Sheikh Mohammed Shami Foundation. The total cost was $400,000.

Incidents
In September 2021, a Palestinian gardener was shot dead near the village when he apparently lit up a cigarette near a group of Kfir Brigade soldiers sitting nearby in ambush for potential Molotov bomb throwers.

See also
Farouk Shami

References

Bibliography

External links
Welcome To Bayt 'Ur al-Tahta
Beit ‘Ur al-Tahta, Welcome to Palestine
Survey of Western Palestine, Map 17:  IAA, Wikimedia commons 
Beit ‘Ur at Tahta Village (Fact Sheet), Applied Research Institute–Jerusalem (ARIJ)
Beit ‘Ur at Tahta Village Profile, ARIJ
 Bayt 'Ur al-Tahta, areal view, ARIJ
Locality Development Priorities and Needs in Beit ‘Ur at Tahta Village, ARIJ

Villages in the West Bank
Ramallah and al-Bireh Governorate
Ancient Jewish settlements of Judaea
Municipalities of the State of Palestine